Edmund Port (February 6, 1906 – March 2, 1986) was a United States district judge of the United States District Court for the Northern District of New York.

Education and career

Born in Syracuse, New York, Port received a Bachelor of Laws from Syracuse University College of Law in 1929. He was in private practice of law in Syracuse from 1929 to 1932. He was hospitalized and convalescing due to tuberculosis from 1932 to 1934. He returned to private practice in Syracuse from 1934 to 1953. He was an Attorney and District Compensation Officer for the Works Progress Administration and the Civilian Conservation Corps in Syracuse from 1935 to 1938. He was a rent attorney of the Office of Price Administration in Syracuse from 1942 to 1943. He was an Assistant United States Attorney of the Northern District of New York from 1943 to 1951. He was the United States Attorney for the Northern District of New York from 1951 to 1953. He was in private practice of law in Auburn, New York from 1953 to 1964.

Federal judicial service

Port was nominated by President Lyndon B. Johnson on April 30, 1964, to a seat on the United States District Court for the Northern District of New York vacated by Judge Stephen W. Brennan. He was confirmed by the United States Senate on July 1, 1964, and received his commission on July 2, 1964. He assumed senior status on February 7, 1976. His service was terminated on March 2, 1986, due to his death in New Smyrna Beach, Florida.

See also
List of Jewish American jurists

References

Sources
 

1906 births
1986 deaths
Judges of the United States District Court for the Northern District of New York
United States district court judges appointed by Lyndon B. Johnson
20th-century American judges
Syracuse University College of Law alumni
United States Attorneys for the Northern District of New York
Lawyers from Syracuse, New York
20th-century American lawyers
Assistant United States Attorneys